Shinnecock Hills Golf Club is a links-style golf club located in an unincorporated area of the Town of Southampton on Long Island, New York, situated between the Peconic Bay and the Atlantic Ocean.

Shinnecock Hills is believed to be the oldest incorporated golf club in the United States (1891), to have the oldest golf clubhouse in the U.S. (1892), and to have been the first American golf club to admit women members, which it did from the start. It is also the only golf course to host the U.S. Open in three different centuries.

Shinnecock Hills is a founding member of the United States Golf Association. It has hosted several important events, notably five U.S. Opens, most recently being the 2018 event won by Brooks Koepka. It is scheduled to host a sixth in 2026. It was added to the National Register of Historic Places 

It is routinely ranked as one of the greatest golf courses in the world.

History

The club traces its roots to an 1889–1890 trip by William K. Vanderbilt, Edward Meade, and Duncan Cryder, to Biarritz in southern France where they encountered champion golfer Willie Dunn, from Scotland, who was building a golf course at 

Back in the United States, Meade and Cryder scouted for a place for a golf course near New York City. Meade, known for his cowboy-ish antics trading commodities, was convinced that upstate New York would be the ideal location, but Cryder preferred a parcel of land in Yonkers. Ultimately, they chose the sandhills adjoining the Long Island Rail Road just east of the Shinnecock Canal. The  original parcel was purchased from developers for $2,500 and 44 original members signed up for $100 each.

Willie Davis, the club professional from the Royal Montreal Club, designed a 12-hole course that opened in late summer 1891. Members of the Shinnecock Indian Nation helped build the course, which sits on the large expanse of land the Nation claims was illegally taken from them by earlier settlers of the area in 1859. At the 2018 U.S. Open, members of the Nation protested the event, noting that several burial sites were desecrated during the courses' construction. Stanford White designed the 1892 clubhouse, said to be the oldest golf clubhouse in the United States. A nine-hole ladies-only course was designed and built at Shinnecock Hills in 1893, the first ladies’ golf course in American history.

In 1894, Dunn arrived and added six more holes bringing the total to 18. That same year Dunn won the tournament which was an inaugural attempt to establish a national championship at Newport, Rhode Island, but this victory was not recognized as official. Later in 1894, Shinnecock Hills was one of five founding clubs of the United States Golf Association, established in New York City. The new USGA held the first U.S. Open in 1895 in Newport, Rhode Island.

In 1896 the then– Shinnecock hosted the second U.S. Open. Many players broke 80 in the 36-hole event, which led to demands to increase the course's difficulty. Participating in the 1896 Open was black professional player John Shippen, believed by many historians to have been the first USA-born golf professional.

In 1901 the ladies' course was incorporated into a lengthened and redesigned course by Charles B. Macdonald and Seth Raynor, retaining five of Dunn's original holes.

William Flynn extensively redesigned the course in 1931 into a  configuration. Flynn's design retains five of the holes by Macdonald and Raynor, and the green of a sixth hole designed by those two.

Shinnecock Hills was ranked second in Golf Digests 100 Greatest Courses Ranking for 2007, 2008, and third in 2009.

Its routing was retained, and several new tees were added, in preparation for the 2018 U.S. Open; the course was extended to 7,440 yards, retaining its par of 70. Shinnecock Hills is scheduled to host the 2026 U.S. Open.

The club also maintains a nine-hole secondary course for use by its members.

Notable events hosted

 A sixth U.S. Open at Shinnecock Hills is scheduled for 2026

Scorecard

:

See also
National Golf Links of America (located immediately north of the course across Sebonac Road)

References

External links

Official website
Satellite Images and Photos of Shinnecock Hills Golf Club
Golf Club Atlas: Guide to Shinnecock Hills course
A True Golfer's Dream

Southampton (town), New York
Golf clubs and courses in New York (state)
Golf clubs and courses designed by Charles B. Macdonald
Golf clubs and courses on the National Register of Historic Places
Clubhouses on the National Register of Historic Places in New York (state)
Walker Cup venues
Sports venues in Suffolk County, New York
National Register of Historic Places in Suffolk County, New York
Sports venues on the National Register of Historic Places in New York (state)
1891 establishments in New York (state)
Sports venues completed in 1891
Golf clubs and courses designed by William Davis (golfer)
Shinnecock Indian Nation